Peraia is a suburb of Thessaloniki, Greece. It is part of the municipality Thermaikos. Peraia is located on the south coast of the Thermaic Gulf, 15 km south of Thessaloniki city centre and 4 km west of Thessaloniki International Airport.

History

As is the case for the two other communities in the municipal unit of Thermaikos, Agia Triada and Neoi Epivates, the origin of settlement in Peraia was the arrival of 740 refugees from Asia Minor and Eastern Thrace in 1923, as a result of the Greco-Turkish War (1919–22).

Today Peraia, together with the other suburbs of Thermaikos, forms one of the most rapidly developing suburbs of Thessaloniki, with many people choosing to move there; but infrastructure is hardly keeping pace, with many roads remaining unopened or inadequate for today's needs. Although developments have been made in creating a pedestrianised beachfront and creating new open spaces.

References

Populated places in Thessaloniki (regional unit)
Populated coastal places in Greece